Espérance FC is a Cameroonian football club based in Guider. They are a member of the Cameroonian Football Federation. Their home stadium is Stade Municipal de Guider.

Stadium
The club uses Stade Municipal de Guider, a multi-use stadium in Guider, Cameroon, as its home ground. The stadium holds 2,000 people.

References

External links
Espérance Guider at everythingforfootball.co.uk

Football clubs in Cameroon
Sports clubs in Cameroon